Andorra competed at the 2009 Mediterranean Games held in Pescara, Italy.

Athletics
Women

Shooting 
Men

Swimming 
Women

Men

Nations at the 2009 Mediterranean Games
2009
Mediterranean Games